Hypotia chretieni is a species of snout moth in the genus Hypotia. It was described by Daniel Lucas in 1910 and is known from Iran and Tunisia.

References

Moths described in 1910
Hypotiini